The yellow-spotted monitor (Varanus panoptes), also known as the Argus monitor, is a monitor lizard found in northern and western regions of Australia and southern New Guinea.

Taxonomy
The first description of the species was provided in a revision of the varanids of Western Australia, where the family is represented by diverse taxa in a wide variety of habitats. Early collections and descriptions of the region's species have historically been uncertain, leading the ICZN to issue an opinion that related to this taxon.
A third subspecies was published in 1988, based on specimens from southern New Guinea. The describing author discovered that the specimen selected as the type of Varanus gouldii was in fact assignable to this species, recently described by reptile specialist Glenn Storr. By issuing an opinion on the various taxonomic considerations, the voting members conserved the name published with John Edward Gray's description and stabilised the nomenclature of this species name.

Three subspecies are recognised by the Australian Faunal Directory and the Reptile Database:

 Varanus panoptes rubidus Storr, 1980. The holotype of this subspecies was obtained near Cue, Western Australia, at the midwest of the continent, and the population is endemic to the north and west of that state. (rubidus referring to its reddish coloration)
Varanus panoptes panoptes, Storr, 1980. The nominate subspecies occurring across the north of mainland Australia, Arnhem Land, the Kimberley and Cape York Peninsula.
 Varanus panoptes horni, Böhme, 1988. A population that discovered in southern New Guinea that was recognised as having a close affinity to the description of this species. It is also known as Horn's monitor.

The epithet panoptes was inspired by a mythological figure with one hundred eyes, the protector of Princess Io named Argus Panoptes. The species may be referred to as the floodplains goanna in the northern regions of Australia.

Description

A ground-dwelling species of Varanus, it somewhat resembles the widespread sand goanna (Varanus gouldii). Large, dark spots appear in rows along its back, becoming especially distinct at the center of the back where they are interspersed with smaller and paler spots. Bands of color occur toward the tip of the tail. The overall coloration is brownish in the nominate subspecies, V. panoptes panoptes, and reddish in  V. panoptes rubidus.

It's the third largest lizard in Australia, after perentie and lace monitor. The larger subspecies is V. panoptes panoptes and the smaller one is V. panoptes horni. It is a reasonably lean monitor and does not put on the bulk that other monitors in Africa and Asia do. Most Varanus panoptes are yellow in color, with a background of brown or dark tan, but their color often varies on an individual basis or on their place of origin.

Breeding 
In Arnhem Land, they lay 6 to 13 eggs between January and February. Due to similar genetic structures, the yellow-spotted monitor is able to naturally hybridise with the Gould's monitor with a stable hybrid zone.

Behavior

Varanus panoptes is a versatile predator and inhabits a large variety of biomes and habitats. They are primarily terrestrial, meaning they spend a great deal of time on the ground. This species is an avid digger and will dig large burrows or take over an already existing burrow, where they spend a sizable portion of their time. Despite this, they will eagerly forage in trees and in the water. These large lizards are quite fast and will run up to 100 meters away to the nearest tree or burrow when they are chased. Varanus panoptes is riparian in habits and as such, it can usually be found around a permanent source of water. Varanus panoptes will often "tripod" in captivity and in the wild, raising up on their hind legs and supporting themselves with their tail. This unusual behavior is used to spot potential prey or enemies from a distance or when they are threatened. They exhibit this behavior regularly in captivity.  This habit provides them a unique characteristic that separates them from most other monitors.

Its prey consists of almost anything that it can overpower. This includes fish, crabs, small birds, rodents, insects and even other monitors. They hunt for prey by keying in on movement, chasing it down and overpowering it. In captivity, this monitor has been observed swinging rodent prey around rapidly by the tail in what appears to be an attempt to stun the animal, before biting at the prey's neck. Varanus panoptes frequently preys on the dwarf monitors that it shares its range with. Spiny-tailed goannas and Kimberley rock monitors are eaten regularly. Varanus panoptes have great senses, with smell being the most acute. Like all monitors, Varanus panoptes has a forked tongue and a vomeronasal organ in the roof of its mouth. It uses this organ in the same manner as snakes and other varanids do and can often be seen flicking their tongues in search of a meal.

Recent studies suggest that the infestation of cane toads, a novel and toxic species, has severely damaged the population structure of Varanus panoptes within the Top End. It is estimated that numbers have dropped by as much as 90% in many areas.

In captivity
Many individuals of this species are captive bred as a conservation effort against poisoning from the cane toad infestation of the species’ native range and as exotic pets. Varanus panoptes are fed insects, fish and mice. V. panoptes are husky lizards that can be a challenge to physically handle. They do not like to be restrained, and can use their sharp claws in their attempts to squirm free. If left to wander freely on open ground, their ability to suddenly flee makes escape likely. Night-time temperatures may drop  or more if the opportunity to warm up the next day exists.

References

Other sources 
Akeret, B. 2006. Bau einer Großterrarienanlage für Warane und Hornvipern. Draco 7 (26): 38-
Anonymous 2000. Hydrosaurus gouldii Gray, 1838 (currently Varanus gouldii) and Varanus panoptes Storr, 1980 (Reptilia, Squamata): specific names conserved by the designation of a neotype for H. gouldii. Bull. Zool. Nomenclature 57 (1): 63-65
Bennet, D.F. 2003. Australische Warane. Reptilia (Münster) 8 (5): 18-25
Bennet, D.F. 2003. Der Varanus-gouldii-Komplex. Reptilia (Münster) 8 (5): 26-28
Bennet, D.F. 2003. Australian Monitors. Reptilia (GB) (30): 12-19
Bennet, D.F. 2003. The Varanus gouldii group. Reptilia (GB) (30): 27-29
Böhme, W. 1988. Der Arguswaran (Varanus panoptes, Storr 1980) auf Neuguinea: Varanus panoptes horni spp. n. Salamandra 24 (2/3): 87-101.
Böhme,W. 2003. Checklist of the living monitor lizards of the world (family Varanidae). Zool. Verhand., Leiden 341: 6-43
Böhme,W. & T. ZIEGLER 1998. Comments on the proposed conservation of the names Hydrosaurus gouldii Gray, 1838 and Varanus panoptes STORR, 1980 (Reptilia, Squamata) by the designation of a neotype for Hydrosaurus gouldii (Case 3042; see BZN 54: 95-99, 249-250; 55: 106-111). Bull. Zool. Nomenclature 55 (3): 173-174.
Cogger, H.G. (2000). Reptiles and Amphibians of Australia, 6th ed. Ralph Curtis Publishing, Sanibel Island, 808 pp.
Lenk, P.; Eidenmueller, B.; Staudter, H.; Wicker, R.; Wink, M. 2005. A parthenogenetic Varanus. Amphibia-Reptilia 26 (4): 507-514
Packard, Gary C. and THOMAS J. BOARDMAN 2009. Bias in interspecic allometry: examples from morphological scaling in varanid lizards. Biological Journal of the Linnean Society, (2009), 96, 296–305.
Schardt, M. (2000). Aktuelle Übersicht zur Nomenklatur der australischen "Gouldswarane" sowie Angaben zur Haltung und Nachzucht von Varanus panoptes panoptes Storr, (1980). Herpetofauna 22 (129): 22-32
Sprackland R G.; Smith H M. & Strimple P D. 1997. Hydrosaurus gouldii Gray, 1838 (currently Varanus gouldii) and Varanus panoptes Storr, 1980 (Reptilia, Squamata): Proposed conservation of the specific names by the designation of a neotype for H. gouldii. Bulletin of Zoological Nomenclature 54 (2): 95-99.

Varanus
Monitor lizards of New Guinea
Monitor lizards of Australia
Reptiles of the Northern Territory
Reptiles of Queensland
Reptiles of Western Australia
Reptiles of Papua New Guinea
Reptiles of Western New Guinea
Reptiles described in 1980
Taxa named by Glen Milton Storr